Hugo Colace (born December 3, 1953, in Buenos Aires) is an Argentine film cinematographer.
Three of his most recent films have been critically well received: La Ciénaga (2001), Historias mínimas (2002), and 18-j (2004).

Filmography (partial)
 Abierto de 18 a 24 (1988) aka Open from 18 to 24
 Las Boludas (1993) aka After all it's Only Life
 El Dedo en la llaga (1996) aka The Salt in the Wound
 Secretos compartidos (1998)
 Operación Fangio (1999)
 Nueces para el amor (2000) aka Nuts for Love
 La Ciénaga (2001) aka The Swamp
 Déjala correr (2001)
 Historias mínimas (2002) aka Intimate Stories
 El juego de Arcibel (2003) aka Arcibel's Game
 El Perro (2004) aka Bombón: El Perro
 18-j (2004)
 Condón Express (2005)
 El Camino de San Diego (2006) aka The Road to San Diego
 Una Estrella y dos cafés (2006)

References

External links
 
 

1953 births
Argentine cinematographers
Living people
People from Buenos Aires